The 1968 NHL Amateur Draft was the sixth NHL Entry Draft. It was held at the Queen Elizabeth Hotel in Montreal, Quebec.

Selections by round
Below are listed the selections in the 1968 NHL amateur draft.

Round one

Notes
 The Oakland Seals' first-round pick went to the Montreal Canadiens as the result of a trade on May 21, 1968 that sent Norm Ferguson, Stan Fuller and future considerations (François Lacombe and Michel Jacques traded completed in June, 1968) to Oakland in exchange for Wally Boyer, Alain Caron, California's 1970 first-round pick, future considerations (Lyle Bradley traded completed in June, 1968) and this pick.

Round two

Round three

Draftees based on nationality

See also
 1968–69 NHL season
 List of NHL players

References

External links
 1968 NHL Amateur Draft player stats at The Internet Hockey Database
 HockeyDraftCentral.com

Draft
National Hockey League Entry Draft